The R-Line is a zero-fare circulator bus service that traverses a three-mile loop in the shape of an inverted U through downtown Raleigh, North Carolina. The three green-painted, hybrid-electric buses stop every 15 minutes at stops marked with an R-Line sign. Service runs from 7 AM to 11 PM Monday through Wednesday, 7 AM to 2:15 AM Thursday through Saturday, and 1 PM to 8 PM Sunday.

Major Stops 
As of May 2020, the list of stops includes:

R1 - Raleigh Convention Center and Red Hat Amphitheater
R2 - Duke Energy Center for the Performing Arts and Shaw University 
R4, R5 - City Market at Moore Square, Moore Square Historic District, and Marbles Kids Museum
R6 - State Capitol
R7 - North Carolina Museum of Natural Sciences and North Carolina Museum of History
R9 and R20 - William Peace University
R14 - Raleigh Union Station
R23 - North Carolina General Assembly
R25 - City of Raleigh Municipal Complex

References

External links
 - R-Line page at the City of Raleigh website - Retrieved 27 Jun 2020.

Transportation in Raleigh, North Carolina
Zero-fare transport services